Skinnerhyus shermerorum is an extinct peccary species from the late Miocene of Nebraska, United States.  It had comparatively enormous, wing-like cheekbones.

References

Miocene even-toed ungulates
Miocene mammals of North America
Peccaries
Fossil taxa described in 2013
Paleontology in Nebraska
Prehistoric even-toed ungulate genera